The Pioneers or Astrophysics Pioneers Program is a NASA program started in 2020 intended to use small-size hardware. The missions are expected to include SmallSats, Balloon payloads, and payloads attached to the ISS, with a $20M cost cap. 

Four were the concepts chosen to study in January 2021, which will undergo a review before approval for flight:
Aspera, a SmallSat to study galaxy evolution
Pandora, a SmallSat to study at least 20 stars and their respective exoplanets in order to determine their atmospherical composition
StarBurst, a SmallSat to detect high-energy gamma rays from the merger of neutron stars
PUEO, a balloon mission intended to be launched from Antarctica in order to detect signals from neutrinos

References

NASA programs